Pennsylvania Dutch Birch Beer is a brand of soft drink, of the birch beer type, whose trademark is owned by USA Beverages, Inc., a beverage bottler operating primarily in the United States. It is available in regular and diet varieties, and is sold in 12 ounce cans, 20 ounce plastic bottles, and 2-liter bottles. Pennsylvania Dutch Birch Beer's regular variety is sweetened with sugar and/or high-fructose corn syrup. Its diet variety has been sweetened with saccharin and/or aspartame as these have gained preferability.

Some other bottlers offer their own versions of birch beer.   In the earlier 1990s Pennsylvania Dutch Birch Beer brand was bottled under authority of the PDBB Co. by A-Treat Beverages, Inc. (Allentown, PA) and Pepsi Cola Bottling (Williamsport, PA) and was distributed by D & M Management, Inc. (Davidsville, PA), an independent beverage distribution firm, in the West Central Pennsylvania, Maryland, Washington, DC, and the Northern Virginia areas.

External links
 Official website

References

Soft beers and malt drinks
American soft drinks
Pennsylvania Dutch cuisine